The VRT35 is 3.5L V12 piston engine from Nissan. It was developed for competition racing during the early 1990s by Nissan's motorsport division Nismo.

History
Originally developed to be used in the Nissan P35 race car for Group C racing, the VRT35 would later see use in the 1992 All Japan Sports Prototype Championship. Required to be 3.5 litres by Group C rules, the engine had to not only be high-revving like a Formula One engine, but also have endurance capabilities. The VRT35 would be a V12, in comparison to Peugeot, Toyota, and Mazda's V10 units. Johnny O'Connell, a test driver for the Nissan P35 race car once said "Well it was about the most amazing sounding engine I have driven. It totally screamed.".

Specifications of VRT35
Aspiration: Naturally aspirated
Valvetrain: DOHC, 4 Valves per Cylinder
Displacement: 
Bore x Stroke: 
Power:  at 11,600 rpm
Torque:  at 9,200 rpm

See also
 List of Nissan engines
 Nissan P35
 Nissan VRH35 engine
 Nismo
 Nissan 

VRT35
V12 engines
Gasoline engines by model